Carex digitalis is a tussock-forming species of perennial sedge in the family Cyperaceae. It is native to south eastern parts of Canada as well as central and eastern parts of the United States.

Description
The sedge has a densely turfy appearance with many shots from the same root forming a thick mat. The leaves are surrounded by white or light brown basal sheaths with higher green coloured sheaths being green in colour.

Taxonomy
The species was first described by the botanist Carl Ludwig Willdenow in 1805 as a part of the work Species Plantarum.

Distribution
The plant is found in temperate areas. In Canada it is found in Ontario in the east to parts of Quebec in the north and to Nova Scotia in the east. The range extends south through the United States to Texas and Oklahoma in the south-east and Florida in the south-west.

See also
List of Carex species

References

digitalis
Taxa named by Carl Ludwig Willdenow
Plants described in 1805
Flora of Alabama
Flora of Arkansas
Flora of Connecticut
Flora of Delaware
Flora of Florida
Flora of Georgia (U.S. state)
Flora of Illinois
Flora of Indiana
Flora of Kentucky
Flora of Louisiana
Flora of Maine
Flora of Maryland
Flora of Massachusetts
Flora of Michigan
Flora of Mississippi
Flora of Missouri
Flora of New Jersey
Flora of New York (state)
Flora of North Carolina
Flora of Nova Scotia
Flora of Ohio
Flora of Oklahoma
Flora of Ontario
Flora of Pennsylvania
Flora of Quebec
Flora of Rhode Island
Flora of South Carolina
Flora of Tennessee
Flora of Texas
Flora of Vermont
Flora of Virginia
Flora of West Virginia
Flora of Wisconsin